Mitchell S. Zuckoff (born April 18, 1962) is an American professor of journalism at Boston University. His books include Lost in Shangri-La and 13 Hours (2014).

Mitchell is a graduate of John F Kennedy High School in Bellmore, New York (Class of 1979)

Biography
Zuckoff received a master's degree from the University of Missouri and is currently the Redstone journalism professor at Boston University. He lives in Newton, Massachusetts, with his wife and two daughters. He is also an author of multiple books.

Writings

13 Hours: The Inside Account of What Really Happened In Benghazi (2014) was co-written with the security team members who were involved in the 2012 Benghazi attack. It tells the story of the 13-hour Benghazi incident from the perspective of the security team who were involved in the fighting, without discussing later political controversies.

Frozen in Time: An Epic Story of Survival and a Modern Quest for Lost Heroes of World War II (2013) is about a US military airplane that crashed on the Greenland glacier during World War II, the subsequent hunt for the plane and Zuckoff's own role in helping to find the plane buried in the ice decades later.

Lost in Shangri-La: A True Story of Survival, Adventure, and the Most Incredible Rescue Mission of World War II (2011) is about a US military airplane called "The Gremlin Special", which crashed on May 13, 1945, in New Guinea, and the subsequent rescue of the survivors. Lost in Shangri-La won the Laurence L. & Thomas Winship/PEN New England Award and spent several months on The New York Times Best Seller list.

His earlier books include Robert Altman: The Oral Biography, Ponzi’s Scheme: The True Story of a Financial Legend, and Choosing Naia: A Family's Journey. He is co-author with Dick Lehr of Judgment Ridge: The True Story Behind the Dartmouth Murders.

Zuckoff's magazine work has appeared in The New Yorker, Fortune, and elsewhere.

As of 2019, ABC was developling a documentary adaptation of his novel Fall and Rise: The Story of 9/11 to commemorate the anniversary.

Awards and honors
As a reporter at The Boston Globe, Zuckoff was a Pulitzer Prize finalist for investigative reporting. He received the Distinguished Writing Award from the American Society of Newspaper Editors, the Livingston Award for International Reporting, the Heywood Broun Award, and the Associated Press Managing Editors' Public Service Award.

Publications
2019 Fall and Rise: The Story of 9/11
2014 13 Hours: The Inside Account of What Really Happened In Benghazi, 
2013 Frozen in Time: An Epic Story of Survival and a Modern Quest for Lost Heroes of World War II, 
2011 Lost in Shangri-La: A True Story of Survival, Adventure, and the Most Incredible Rescue Mission of World War II, 
2009 Robert Altman: The Oral Biography, 
2005 Ponzi's Scheme: The True Story of a Financial Legend, 
2003 with Dick Lehr: Judgment Ridge: The True Story Behind the Dartmouth Murders, 
2002 Choosing Naia: A Family's Journey,

References

External links
 Boston University faculty information page on Zuckoff
 Author's web site
 

1962 births
Living people
University of Missouri alumni
John F. Kennedy High School (Bellmore, New York) alumni
Boston University faculty
Livingston Award winners for International Reporting